Austnes Peninsula is a short, broad, ice-covered peninsula forming the southeast end of Edward VIII Plateau and the north side of the entrance to Edward VIII Bay; Cape Gotley marks the extremity of this peninsula. It was mapped by Norwegian cartographers from aerial photographs taken by the Lars Christensen Expedition in January–February 1937, and named "Austnes" ("east promontory") by them because of its eastward projection.

Further reading 
 Defense Mapping Agency  1992, Sailing Directions (planning Guide) and (enroute) for Antarctica, P 421

External links 

 Austnes Peninsula on USGS website
 Austnes Peninsula on AADC website
 Austnes Peninsula on SCAR website
 Austnes Peninsula area map
 Austnes Peninsula on marineregions.org

References 
 

Peninsulas of Antarctica
Landforms of Kemp Land